Badraq-e Nuri (also Romanized as Badrāq-e Nūrī) is a village in Katul Rural District, in the Central District of Aliabad County, Golestan Province, Iran. At the 2006 census, its population was 2,039, in 397 families.

Notes 

Populated places in Aliabad County